The 2015 AFF U-16 Youth Championship is the 10th edition of the AFF U-16 Youth Championship, organised by the ASEAN Football Federation. It will be hosted by Cambodia for the second time after the 2007 AFF U-17 Youth Championship. It will be played between 27 July to 9 August 2015. It was set to be hosted by Indonesia but they were suspended by FIFA in May 2015.

Participant teams

All twelve member associations of the ASEAN Football Federation were set to take part in the tournament featuring three groups of four teams, but with Indonesia's suspension, they were omitted and the AFF reverted to two groups featuring six and five teams.

The following groups were drawn at the 15th AFF Council meeting in Singapore on 16 June 2015.

Venues
The two venues to host matches are Olympic Stadium and Army Stadium in Phnom Penh. The matches of Group A will be held in Olympic Stadium and Army Stadium; the matches of Group B will be held in Olympic Stadium and the matches of Knockout stage will be held in Olympic Stadium.

Squads

Players born on or after 1 January 1999 are eligible to compete in the tournament. Each team can register a maximum of 23 players (minimum three of whom must be goalkeepers).

Group stage
The top two teams of each group advance to the semi-finals.

Tiebreakers
The teams are ranked according to points (3 points for a win, 1 point for a draw, 0 points for a loss). If tied on points, tiebreakers are applied in the following order:
Greater number of points obtained in the group matches between the teams concerned;
Goal difference resulting from the group matches between the teams concerned;
Greater number of goals scored in the group matches between the teams concerned;
If, after applying criteria 1 to 3, teams still have an equal ranking, criteria 1 to 3 are reapplied exclusively to the matches between the teams in question to determine their final rankings. If this procedure does not lead to a decision, criteria 5 to 9 apply;
Goal difference in all the group matches;
Greater number of goals scored in all the group matches;
Penalty shoot-out if only two teams are involved and they are both on the field of play;
Lower score calculated according to the number of yellow and red cards received in the group matches (1 point for a single yellow card, 3 points for a red card as a consequence of two yellow cards, 3 points for a direct red card, 4 points for a yellow card followed by a direct red card);
Drawing of lots.

All matches held in Phnom Penh, Cambodia.
All times are local, UTC+7.

Group A

Notes

Group B

Knockout stage
In the knockout stage, penalty shoot-out is used to decide the winner if necessary (extra time is not used).

Bracket

Semi-finals

Third place match

Final

Winners

Awards
The following awards were given at the conclusion of the tournament:

Final ranking
As per statistical convention in football, matches decided in extra time are counted as wins and losses, while matches decided by penalty shoot-outs are counted as draws.

Goalscorers
8 goals

  Marc Moric
  John Roberts

7 goals

  Jinnawat Russamee

5 goals

  Lachlan Brook
  Bounphachan Bounkong

4 goals

  Rahmat Akbari
  Xayyaphon Sengsavang

3 goals

  Dylan Pierias
  Win Naing Tun
  Korrawit Tasa
  Trần Văn Đạt

2 goals

  Ramy Najjarine
  Ahmed Sweedan
  Mohammad Hanif Adanan
  Nalin
  Hein Htet Aung
  Pyae Sone Naing
  Rezza Rezky Ramadhani
  Hassawat Nopnate
  Armindo Gusmao
  Danilson Araujo
  Filomeno Costa
  Nguyễn Hồng Sơn
  Nguyễn Khắc Khiêm

1 goal

  Eduardo Castaneda
  Jacob Italiano
  Dylan Ryan
  Adrian Valenti
  Abdul Hariz Herman
  Teat Kimheng
  Thatsaphone Saysouk
  Ariq Shaqirin Suhaimi
  Muhammad Alif Safwan
  Muhammad Nizarruddin Jazi
  Aung Chit Oo Ko Ko
  Htet Phyoe Wai
  Kyaw Kyaw Htet
  Fidel Victor Tacardon
  Joseph Sherwyn Calunsag
  Robert Lawrence Wilson
  Glenn Kweh Jia Jin
  Hidayatul Firdaus Johan
  Jordan Nicolas Vestering
  Khairul Hairee Abdul Hamid
  Muhammad Sharul Shah
  Natthapong Nakpitak
  Santipap Yaemsaen
  Sittirak Koetkhumthong
  Dom Braz
  Joao Frtas
  Yafet Barros
  Bùi Anh Đức
  Lê Ngọc Thái
  Nguyễn Hữu Thắng 

Own goals

  Ngô Kim Long (playing against Thailand)
  Nguyễn Xuân Kiên (playing against Malaysia)

References

External links

Cambodia
AFF U-16 Youth Championship
AFF U-16
International association football competitions hosted by Cambodia
2015 in youth association football